The 2001 Women's World Water Polo Championship was the fifth edition of the women's water polo tournament at the World Aquatics Championships, organised by the world governing body in aquatics, the FINA. The tournament was held from 18 to 27 July 2001 in the Nishi Civic Pool, and was incorporated into the 2001 World Aquatics Championships in Fukuoka, Japan.

The draw for the water polo tournament took place on 16 April 2001 in Fukuoka. Prior to the start of the competition, Australia were ranked number one in the world.

Teams

Group A
 
 
 
 
 
 

Group B

Preliminary round

Group A

Group B

Final round

Final ranking

Medalists

Individual awards

 Most Valuable Player
???

 Best Goalkeeper
???

 Topscorer
???

References

 FINA Results

2001
Women's tournament
2001 in women's water polo
Women's water polo in Japan
2001 in Japanese women's sport